One with the Underdogs is the debut full-length release by American beatdown hardcore band Terror. It was released in the US through Trustkill Records and in Germany through Dead Serious Records.

Track listing
 "One with the Underdogs" – 1:26
 "Keep Your Mouth Shut" – 2:21
 "Less Than Zero" – 1:50
 "Are We Alive?" – 1:39
 "Overcome" – 2:26
 "Spit My Rage" (feat. Jamey Jasta & Lord Ezec) – 2:02
 "No One Cares" – 1:14
 "Not This Time" – 3:04
 "Crushed by the Truth" (feat. Hard Corey) – 0:57
 "Out of My Face" – 2:14
 "All I've Got" – 2:31
 "Find My Way" (feat. Freddy Cricien) – 2:20
 "Enemies in Sight" – 8:24

References

Terror (band) albums
2004 albums
Trustkill Records albums
Roadrunner Records albums
Albums recorded at Sound City Studios